Roman Hodovanyi (born 4 October 1990) is a professional Ukrainian football defender.

Career
Hodovanyi attended the different Sportive youth schools in Ternopil. He made his debut for FC Volyn Lutsk played as substituted in the game against FC Naftovyk-Ukrnafta Okhtyrka on 29 March 2010 in Ukrainian First League.

References

External links 
 
 

1990 births
Living people
Sportspeople from Ternopil
Association football defenders
Ukrainian footballers
Ukrainian expatriate footballers
Expatriate footballers in Belarus
Ukrainian expatriate sportspeople in Belarus
Ukrainian Premier League players
FC Nyva Ternopil players
FC Ternopil players
FC Volyn Lutsk players
FC Slavia Mozyr players